Chiesa di Santa Maria alla Fontana is a church in Milan, Italy. Built in 1508, it was traditionally attributed to Leonardo da Vinci, Bramante or Cristoforo Solari (under the commission of Charles II d'Amboise, the French governor of the city, who was allegedly healed by a spring on the site of the future church in 1507):  a document found in 1982, however, revealed that it was designed by Giovanni Antonio Amadeo.

References

External links
Page at the province of Milan landmarks description 

Roman Catholic churches completed in 1508
Maria alla Fontana
Renaissance architecture in Milan
16th-century Roman Catholic church buildings in Italy